Louis Mathieu may refer to:
 Claude-Louis Mathieu (1783–1875), a French astronomer
 Louis Mathieu (1793–1867), a German gardening expert (de.wikisource)